The 2023 BWF World Championships is a badminton tournament which will be held on 21 to 27 August 2023 in Royal Arena, Copenhagen, Denmark. Copenhagen is going to host BWF World Championships for the fifth time.

Host city selection
Copenhagen was awarded the event in November 2018 during the announcement of 18 major badminton event hosts from 2019 to 2025.

References

External links
Official website

BWF World Championships
International sports competitions hosted by Denmark
Badminton tournaments in Denmark
Sport in Copenhagen
BWF World Championships
BWF World
Badminton World Championships
BWF World Championships